The 2018–19 Israeli Basketball State Cup was the 59th edition of the Israeli Basketball State Cup, organized by the Israel Basketball Association. 

The Final Four of the tournament was held from February 11–14 in the Pais Arena in Jerusalem.

On February 14, 2019, Hapoel Jerusalem won its fifth State Cup title after an 82–67 win over Maccabi Rishon LeZion in the Final. TaShawn Thomas was named the Final MVP.

Bracket

First round
Ten teams participated in the First Round. Maccabi Tel Aviv, Hapoel Holon and Hapoel Jerusalem were pre-qualified for the quarterfinals and didn't play in the First Round.

On October 15, 2018, The Israel Basketball Association (IBBA) disqualified all the teams from the Liga Leumit, aside from Maccabi Haifa, due to the league's lockout.

B. Herzliya vs. H. Eilat

H. Be'er Sheva vs. I. Nes Ziona

M. Haifa vs. H. Gilboa Galil

M. Rishon LeZion vs. I. Nahariya

M. Ashdod vs. H. Tel Aviv

Quarterfinals

H. Eilat vs. H. Holon

H. Be'er Sheva vs. H. Tel Aviv

H. Gilboa Galil vs. H. Jerusalem

M. Rishon LeZion vs. M. Tel Aviv

Final four
The Final Four of the tournament was held from February 11–14 in the Pais Arena in Jerusalem.

Semifinals

M. Rishon LeZion vs. H. Tel Aviv

H. Jerusalem vs. H. Holon

Final

H. Jerusalem vs. M. Rishon LeZion

See also
2018–19 Israeli Basketball Premier League
Liga Leumit

References

2019
Cup